Panola Mountain is a  granite monadnock near Stockbridge on the boundary between Henry County and Rockdale County, Georgia. The South River marks the boundary between Henry, Rockdale, and DeKalb counties. Due to its delicate ecological features, Panola Mountain was designated a National Natural Landmark in 1980.

References

External links
 
Panola Mountain State Park

State parks of Georgia (U.S. state)
Mountains of Georgia (U.S. state)
Inselbergs of North America
National Natural Landmarks in Georgia (U.S. state)
Protected areas of Rockdale County, Georgia
Protected areas of Henry County, Georgia
Nature centers in Georgia (U.S. state)
Landforms of Rockdale County, Georgia
Landforms of Henry County, Georgia